Tratex (earlier called GePos) is a geometric sans-serif typeface family for road signs in Sweden. It was developed for maximal readability in traffic, and designed by Karl-Gustaf Gustafsson (known as Kåge Gustafsson).

Since 2014, Tratex has also been used on road signs in the Swedish-speaking autonomous region of Åland in Finland.

Tratex also contains Sami characters. It is free to download and use for illustrations and prints.

See also 
 Public signage typefaces
 Roads signs in Sweden

References

External links 
Tratex on dafont.com
Tratex download 

Government typefaces
Geometric sans-serif typefaces